Néstor Torres is a jazz flautist born in Mayaguez, Puerto Rico, in 1957.  He took flute lessons at age 12 and began formal studies at the Escuela Libre de Música, eventually attending Puerto Rico’s Inter-American University. At 18, he moved to New York with his family. Torres went on to study both jazz and classical music at the Mannes College of Music in New York and the New England Conservatory of Music in Boston, among other places.

Torres is also a practitioner of Nichiren Buddhism and a longtime  member of the Buddhist association Soka Gakkai International.

In 2007, Torres played at the World Music Concert during One World Week 2007 at the University of Warwick.

In 2010, Torres joined the faculty of Florida International University as a visiting guest artist and founding director of its School of Music's first charanga ensemble.  

On March 21, 2009, he played in Herbst Theatre in San Francisco in performance "Tango Meets Jazz" with Pablo Ziegler.

On September 9, 2009, he played at the Greek Theatre (Los Angeles) with the Dave Matthews Band. He guested on the song "Lying In The Hands Of God."  He performed at the 2010 Central American and Caribbean Games opening ceremony.

Albums
  Colombia En Charanga - Released: 1978
  No Me Provoques - Released: 1981
  Afro - Charanga Vol. 2 - Released: 1983
 Morning Ride - Released: 1989
  Dance of the Phoenix - Released: 1990
  Burning Whispers - Released: 1994
  Talk to Me - Released: 1996
 Treasures of the Heart - Released: 1999
  This Side of Paradise - Released: 2001
  Mis Canciones Primeras - Released: 2001
 Mi Alma Latina - Released: 2002
 The Sutra of The Lotus of The Wonderful Law - Released: 2004
  Sin Palabras - Released: 2004
  Dances, Prayers & Meditations For Peace - Released: 2006
  The Very Best Of Nestor Torres (2007)
  Nestor Torres - Nouveau Latino (2008)
  Del Caribe, Soy!: Latin American Flute Music (2017)
  Jazz Flute Traditions (2018)
  Dominican Suite (2022)

References

External links
Official Website
    Distribution Label
 

1957 births
Living people
Puerto Rican jazz musicians
Latin Grammy Award winners
People from Mayagüez, Puerto Rico
Puerto Rican Buddhists
Members of Sōka Gakkai
Smooth jazz flautists
American Buddhists
Nichiren Buddhists